Oxford Ice Rink is a 56 × 26m ice rink located on Oxpens Road in Oxford, England.  It is a ten-minute walk from Oxford city centre and railway station.

In 1980, money was raised by the Oxford Ice Skating Trust (OXIST) for the construction of a new ice rink — a project that was taken over by the Oxford City Council, who continue to own and manage the premises. The rink, designed by Nicholas Grimshaw, was built on Oxpens Road (known as Nun's Walk prior to 1850) and opened in 1984 with an ice hockey match between the Oxford City Stars and the Oxford University Ice Hockey Club. It looks like a ship, thanks to two 30-metre masts at each end.  The north end of the building is fully glazed, allowing plenty of natural light into the rink.

The rink offers public and disco. Both group and individual lessons in figure skating and ice dance are available from BITA qualified instructors.

In February 2009, the Oxford City Council awarded the contract to manage leisure in Oxford. Since 31 March 2009, all of Oxford Leisure, including the Oxford Ice Rink has been run by Fusion-Lifestyle Ltd. This assured the future of the rink for the duration of the contract with Fusion, who will oversee the refurbishment of the facility.

Ice hockey 
Oxford Ice Rink is the home to several ice hockey teams including:

 Oxford City Stars
 Oxford Junior Stars
 Oxford Midnight Stars
 Oxford University Ice Hockey Club
 Oxford University Women’s Blues
 Oxford University Vikings
 RAF Bluewings
 Oxford Bulls
 Oxford Shooting Stars

References

External links 
 
 Fusion Lifestyle
 Architectural design
 OXIST

Sports venues completed in 1984
Buildings and structures in Oxford
Tourist attractions in Oxford
Sports venues in Oxford
Indoor ice hockey venues in England
1984 establishments in England
Nicholas Grimshaw buildings